"Black Box" is a science fiction short story published in May 2012 by  American writer Jennifer Egan.  It was released in an unusual serialized format: as a series of tweets on The New Yorker's Twitter account over nine days beginning May 25, 2012.  The story is in the form of "mental dispatches" from a spy living in the Mediterranean area in the near future.

References

External links
 "Black Box" at The New Yorker
 An In-depth Look at..."Black Box.". (April 29, 2021). Scripturients. Accessed on May 5, 2021.

Literary criticism 
Below are literary critiques pertaining to Jennifer Egan's "Black Box": 

 
 
 
 

2012 short stories
Science fiction short stories
Spy short stories